This is a list of marginal seats in the United Kingdom after the results in the 2010 General Election.

Most marginal constituencies

Ten most marginal seats (by majority) from 2010 General Election.

Conservative marginals

Conservative - Labour marginals

Constituencies where the Conservative Party holds a marginal lead over the Labour Party:

Conservative - Liberal Democrat marginals

Constituencies where the Conservative Party holds a marginal lead over the Liberal Democrats:

Other Conservative marginals

Constituencies where the Conservative Party holds a marginal lead over another party:

Liberal Democrat marginals

Liberal Democrat - Conservative marginals

Constituencies where the Liberal Democrats holds a marginal lead over the Conservative Party:

Liberal Democrat - Labour marginals

Constituencies where the Liberal Democrats holds a marginal lead over the Labour Party:

Labour marginals

Labour - Conservative marginals

Constituencies where the Labour Party holds a marginal lead over the Conservative Party:

Labour - Liberal Democrat marginals

Constituencies where the Labour Party holds a marginal lead over the Liberal Democrats:

Other Labour marginals

Constituencies where the Labour Party holds a marginal lead over another party:

Other Parties

Other Parties marginal seats by majority:

Alliance Party

Democratic Unionist Party

Green Party

Plaid Cymru

Social Democratic Labour Party

Sinn Fein

Scottish National Party

United Kingdom politics-related lists
2010 United Kingdom general election
Lists of marginal seats in the United Kingdom by election